Robert Ball may refer to:

Robert Ball (judoka) (born 1964), Australian judoka
Robert Ball (naturalist) (1802–1857), Irish naturalist
Robert James Ball (1857–1928), Canadian politician
Robert M. Ball (1914–2008), American Social Security official
Robert Stawell Ball (1840–1913), Irish astronomer
Robert W. Ball (born 1943), Canadian naval architect
Robert Ball (artist) (1918–2008), British artist
Robert Ball (bowls) (born 1956), Australian lawn bowler
Bobby Ball (born 1944), English comedian
Bobby Ball (racing driver) (1925–1954), American racing driver

See also
Robert Ball Hughes (1804–1868), British-American sculptor